Ka Choung is a waterfall in Ratanakiri province in Cambodia. The falls are located in Ban Lung District about 7 kilometres north west of the provincial capital Banlung.

References 

Waterfalls of Cambodia
Geography of Ratanakiri province